Schefflera albocapitata is a flowering plant in the family Araliaceae. It is endemic to Costa Rica and Panama.

References 

albocapitata
Flora of Costa Rica
Flora of Panama